Herbert Broom (1815–1882) was an English writer on law.

Life
Broom was born at Kidderminster in 1815, and was educated at Trinity College, Cambridge, where he graduated as a wrangler in 1837. He proceeded LL.D. in 1864. He was called to the bar at the Inner Temple in Michaelmas term 1840, and practised on the home circuit. For a considerable period he occupied the post of reader of common law at the Inner Temple. He died at the Priory, Orpington, Kent, on 2 May 1882.

Legal Maxims (1845) gained wide circulation as an established text-book for students.

Works

Law books
 Practical Rules for determining Parties to Actions, 1843.
 Legal Maxims, 1845. third edition, 1858 Fifth edition, 1870. 
 Practice of Superior Courts, 1850.
 Practice of County Courts, 1852.
 Commentaries on the Common Law, 1856. fourth London edition 1873
 Constitutional Law viewed in relation to Common Law and exemplified by Cases, 1st edition 1866; 2nd edition 1885.
 Commentaries on the Laws of England (with E. Hadley), 1869.
 Philosophy of Law; Notes of Lectures, 1876-8.

Novels
 The Missing Will, 1877
 The Unjust Steward, 1879

References

1815 births
1882 deaths
19th-century English non-fiction writers
People from Kidderminster
Alumni of Trinity College, Cambridge
Members of the Inner Temple
English legal writers